The Roux Scholarship is a cooking competition for up and coming chefs in the UK. Set up by the brothers Michel and Albert Roux, and now run by their sons Alain Roux and Michel Roux Jr. It was first run in 1984 with Andrew Fairlie being named the first winner. It has since been run on a yearly basis, with winners going on to win a three-month placement in a Michelin starred restaurants including the French Laundry and Maison Pic.

History
Colin Page, Director of Marketing, Diners Club UK, conceived the idea of the chefs scholarship with Michel Roux in 1983. The sponsorship of the scholarship was finally agreed between Nick Rowe [M.D] Diners Club that same year following a luncheon at Roux's Waterside Inn when it was agreed the Roux brothers could front a scholarship for up and coming chefs and that Rowe's credit card company would be willing to back it financially. Michel spoke to his brother Albert the following day, who said that Michel could lead on it. Michel thought it would be a good way for young chefs to gain experience in French restaurants, which were not open to employing British chefs at the time. The competition was formerly known as the Roux Diners Club Scholarship.

Each entrant must enter a paper application, which are then reviewed and broken down into regional competitions. Each regional winner goes through to the final, where there is one Scholar named. Entrants are limited to chefs who are working in full-time employment. Chefs are not limited to applying on one occasion; both Simon Hulstone and Mark Birchall competed on four occasions before winning. The winner of the competition is allowed to choose a three Michelin starred restaurant to cook in for three months. 
 
The Current Judging panel for the competition includes Michel Roux, Jr. and Alain Roux as the chairmen, alongside Brian Turner as vice chairman and chefs James Martin, Clare Smyth, Angela Hartnett, Rachel Humphrey, as well as former Roux Scholarship winners André Garrett, Sat Bains & Simon Hulstone. 

From 2016, Each year's National Final has also featured an Honorary President of the Judging Committee, providing unique insight and wisdom to the critique of the finalists abilities. These Chefs are noted for their reputations as some of the best chefs in the world with an emphasis on their passion to help young chefs advance their careers.

Former Judges include Albert Roux, Michel Roux, Victor Ceserani], Peter Kromberg, Heston Blumenthal, Rick Stein, Gary Rhodes, David Nicholls, former Roux Scholar Steve Love and inaugural Roux Scholarship winner Andrew Fairlie.

The 2020 Competition was postponed due to the COVID-19 pandemic, with a combined 2020/2021 competition taking place in September and October, 2021. 

Highlights of the competition, including a Masterclass of the National Final dish(s) by Michel Jr. and Alain are featured on The Roux Scholarship YouTube Channel.

Past winners

References

Awards established in 1984
Culinary arts
Hospitality industry in the United Kingdom
Scholarships in the United Kingdom